Thathagar (ઠાઠાગર) is a Gujarati caste. It is a sub-caste of the Mehra channel in the Brahmakshatriya community which is also known as Khatri Brahmin. During the 19th century the Thathagar community moved from Sindh at Karachi and settled in Gujarat, India. Shri Maa Chamunda is Kuldevi of this community. The famous temple of Maa Chamunda is located at Chotila and Uncha Kotda. The Thathagar community also worships their Dada's temple (Pitru Dev as per Hindu religion) which is located at Ghogha-Bhavnagar and Gariyadhar.

Indian castes